Świerk may refer to:

Świerk, West Pomeranian Voivodeship

People with the surname
Stanisław Świerk